"Current Stand" is a song by Australian pop/new wave group Kids in the Kitchen. The song was released in August 1985 as the fifth single from their debut album, Shine (1985). The song peaked at number 12 on the Australian Kent Music Report.

Track listing 
7" (K9804) 
Side A "Current Stand"  - 3:58
Side B "Current Stand" (Instrumental) - 3:58

Charts

Weekly charts

Year-end charts

References 

1985 songs
1985 singles
Kids in the Kitchen songs
Mushroom Records singles